Kim Jung-woo (born 9 May 1982) is a former South Korean footballer.

Club career
Kim was playing for military team Sangju Sangmu Phoenix to perform compulsory military service when participating in the 2010 FIFA World Cup, and his low salary (₩0.95 million per year) during the military service was the talk of fans before the match against Argentina which had one of the highest earners Lionel Messi.

Kim became the highest-paid player in the K League after moving to Jeonbuk Hyundai Motors on a three-year deal in January 2012.

International career
Kim was part of South Korean under-23 team in 2004 and  2008 Summer Olympics.

Kim represented South Korea in the 2007 AFC Asian Cup. He scored Korea's winning goal against Indonesia and converted the decisive spot-kick in Korea's quarter-final penalty shootout victory over Iran. However, his penalty miss in the shootout against Iraq meant that South Korea went out in the semi-finals stage.

In the 2010 FIFA World Cup, Kim played a pivotal role as a holding midfielder for the South Korean team's advance to the round of 16. Despite rising interests from European clubs, he left to continue serving his country in Gwangju Sangmu.

On 22 March 2019, Kim retired through an official retirement ceremony before the match between South Korea and Bolivia at Ulsan Munsu Football Stadium.

Career statistics

Club

International 

Results list South Korea's goal tally first.

Honours
Ulsan Hyundai Horang-i
K League 1: 2005
Korean League Cup runner-up: 2005

Seongnam Ilhwa Chunma
Korean FA Cup: 2011

Jeonbuk Hyundai Motors
Korean FA Cup runner-up: 2013

South Korea U23
Asian Games bronze medal: 2010

South Korea B
East Asian Games silver medal: 2001

South Korea
AFC Asian Cup third place: 2007
EAFF Championship runner-up: 2010

Individual
K League 1 Best XI: 2009

Notes

References

External links
 
 Kim Jung-woo at KFA 
 
 

1982 births
Living people
Association football forwards
Association football midfielders
South Korean footballers
South Korean expatriate footballers
South Korea international footballers
Footballers from Seoul
Ulsan Hyundai FC players
Nagoya Grampus players
Seongnam FC players
Gimcheon Sangmu FC players
Jeonbuk Hyundai Motors players
Sharjah FC players
Baniyas Club players
Kim Jung-woo
K League 1 players
J1 League players
Expatriate footballers in Japan
Footballers at the 2004 Summer Olympics
2007 AFC Asian Cup players
Footballers at the 2008 Summer Olympics
2010 FIFA World Cup players
Olympic footballers of South Korea
South Korean expatriate sportspeople in Japan
South Korean expatriate sportspeople in the United Arab Emirates
Expatriate footballers in the United Arab Emirates
South Korean expatriate sportspeople in Thailand
Expatriate footballers in Thailand
Korea University alumni
Asian Games medalists in football
Footballers at the 2010 Asian Games
Asian Games bronze medalists for South Korea
Medalists at the 2010 Asian Games
UAE Pro League players